The United Nations Association of Australia (UNAA) is the official non-profit, non-government, membership-based, organisation in Australia working on behalf of the United Nations core body to promote its overall aims and ideals, and equally seeking to build support for the UN's programs, activities, and agencies. The UNAA official mission is "to inform, inspire and engage all Australians regarding the work, goals and values of the UN to create a safer, fairer and more sustainable world". It has division offices in every State and Territory of Australia, with the national office run out of Canberra.

History
The UNAA was established in 1946 and in the following decades, the Association and its state divisions grew and expanded their programs. In 1979 the Victorian division established the annual Media Peace Awards, followed by the establishment of the World Environment Day Awards. During the International Year of the Tree (1982), the UNAA and the Nursery Industry Association of Australia founded an environmental organisation; Greening Australia, to protect, restore, and conserve Australia's native vegetation.

Description and governance
The UNAA works closely with United Nations specialised agencies and departments such as the UNDPI, UNIC, and UNHCR, and has consultative status with ECOSOC as a member of the World Federation of United Nations Associations (WFUNA). The organisation also works closely with the Australian Government, especially the Australian Department of Foreign Affairs (DFAT) and Australian parliamentarians.

The UNAA is governed by a National Board which meets quarterly. The National Board elects a representative Executive Team, including National Executive Director, currently Lachlan Hunter, to take responsibility for the ongoing work nationally. Its national president is Mario D'Elia, who succeeded Major General (Ret'd) Michael G. Smith  in 2019, who in turn succeeded Australian Senator Russell Trood in 2016, who in turn had succeeded Australian Politician Robert Hill in 2012.

What it does
The UNAA also works to support various initiatives of the United Nations which focus on key international affairs topics such as (but not exclusive to):

 Climate change
 Gender equality
 Reconciliation with Australia's Indigenous peoples
 Refugees
 Sustainable development goals

The UNAA hosts over 150 events a year across Australia; hosts public awards ceremonies on a variety of social, media, and environmental topics; drives celebratory UN observance day activities; operates development projects overseas and generally acts as a key link between the UN and the Australian public. 

The UNAA group includes a national academic network, a federal parliamentary group, divisions in every state and territory, a Young Professionals network, a Youth network, and a national office.

Media Peace Awards

The UNAA Media Peace Awards, established in 1979, were awarded on UN Day (24 October), to recognise Australian journalists and media organisations "who had excelled in their promotion of human rights and issues". Justice Kirby referred to the award as the Australian Media Peace Prize in his address at the 1981 presentation of the prize. These Awards, later known as the UNAA Media Awards, or simply UN Day Media Awards, are no longer being presented, with the last being the 2018 awards, presented in 2019 by SBS journalist Sarah Abo.

In 1983, the film Women of the Sun won the award.

Film producer Darren Dale has won the award twice.

A 2015 finalist was an IQ2 debate at The Ethics Centre, for "its role in stimulating public awareness and understanding". The debate achieved prominence in the media owing to an address by journalist Stan Grant on "racism and the Australian Dream".

Model United Nations
The UNAA’s Victorian division hosts student Model United Nations (MUN) Conferences in high schools and universities around the state. These day-long conferences aim to increase student awareness of the United Nations, its processes, values, and the complex issues brought before the UN and the international community, while developing a sense of civic responsibility as future global citizens.

UNAA Young Professionals Network
The UNAA Young Professionals (UNAA YP) network involves and inspires young professionals throughout Australia in international affairs and the work of the United Nations around the world, through fund-raising, awareness-raising, and advocacy campaigns.

United Nations Youth Australia (UNYA)
United Nations Youth Australia (UNYA) is a youth led organisation, born out of the organisation in the 1970s. Its members are aged below 25 years.  UN Youth Australia is not a division of, or run by, the UNAA.

References

External links

World Federation of United Nations Associations
Political organisations based in Australia
Organizations established in 1945